Buse Naz Çakıroğlu (born 26 May 1996) is a Turkish boxer.

Private life
Buse Naz Çakıroğlu was born in Trabzon, Turkey on 26 May 1996. She studied Physical Education and Sport in Düzce University.

Boxing career

Çakıroğlu became champion at the 2017 Women's European Union Amateur Boxing Championships held in Cascia, Italy.

She took the silver medal at the 2018 Women's European Amateur Boxing Championships in Sofia, Bulgaria.

In 2019, she won the gold medal in the flyweight event at the European Games in Minsk, Belarus, another gold medal at the Women's European Amateur Boxing Championships in Alcobendas, Spain, and the silver medal at the AIBA Women's World Boxing Championships in Ulan-Ude, Russia.

She won the silver medal in the flyweight event at the 2020 Summer Olympics.

She won one of the bronze medals in the light flyweight event at the 2022 Mediterranean Games held in Oran, Algeria. Buse Naz Çakıroğlu won a gold medal at the 2022 Women's European Amateur Boxing Championships. Çakıroğlu beat her Irish opponent Caitlin Fryers 5-0 in the 50 kg final in the competition held in Montenegro’s Budva.

References

External links
 

1996 births
Living people
Sportspeople from Trabzon
Turkish women boxers
Flyweight boxers
Fenerbahçe boxers
AIBA Women's World Boxing Championships medalists
Boxers at the 2019 European Games
European Games medalists in boxing
European Games gold medalists for Turkey
Boxers at the 2020 Summer Olympics
Olympic boxers of Turkey
Medalists at the 2020 Summer Olympics
Olympic silver medalists for Turkey
Olympic medalists in boxing
Competitors at the 2022 Mediterranean Games
Mediterranean Games bronze medalists for Turkey
Mediterranean Games medalists in boxing
20th-century Turkish sportswomen
21st-century Turkish sportswomen